Kodeš (Czech and Slovak feminine: Kodešová) is a surname. It may be transcribed as Kodesh. Notable people with the surname include:

 Jan Kodeš (born 1946), Czech tennis player
 Jan Kodeš Jr. (born 1972), Czech tennis player
 Jiří Kodeš (1933–2006), Czechoslovak sprint canoer
 Vlasta Kodešová (born 1944), Czech tennis player

See also
 
 
 Kodesh (disambiguation)

Czech-language surnames
Slovak-language surnames